Tracy Moore (born January 6, 1975) is a Canadian television journalist and host of lifestyle magazine Cityline on Citytv since October 2008.  She previously served as news anchor on Citytv Toronto's Breakfast Television from 2005 to 2008. She fills in for Dina Pugliese as co-host on Breakfast Television on an infrequent basis.

Growing up in Richmond Hill, Ontario, she went to Langstaff Secondary School. According to host Kevin Frankish, "she spent much of her youth as a Baton Twirler with the Progress Yorkettes in York Region." Moore then earned a BA at McGill University and Masters at the University of Western Ontario.

Moore began her career as a videographer for CBC Television, then worked for the now-defunct television station, Toronto 1 before joining Citytv.

In January 2023, she was named the winner of the Academy of Canadian Cinema and Television's Changemaker Award at the 11th Canadian Screen Awards.

She is married to Lio Perron, and has two children, Sidney and Eva.

References

External links
Tracy Moore's Cityline bio

Black Canadian broadcasters
Canadian television journalists
Canadian television talk show hosts
University of Western Ontario alumni
McGill University alumni
People from Richmond Hill, Ontario
1975 births
Living people
Canadian women television journalists
Black Canadian women
Canadian people of Jamaican descent
Canadian Screen Award winning journalists